Gbewaa Palace is the seat of the Yaa Naa of the Kingdom of Dagbon. Located at Nayilifong along the Yendi-Saboba road in Yendi, Gbewaa Palace was named after the patriarch of the Mole-Dagbani people. of Ghana

References

Dagbon